Scottish Investment Trust was an investment trust with a global investment mandate. Established in 1887, the company, which was based in Edinburgh, was listed on the London Stock Exchange. 

In September 2022, the company completed a combination of assets with JPMorgan Global Growth & Income, bringing an end to the trust’s 135 year history.

References

External links
 Official website

Investment trusts of the United Kingdom
Financial services companies of Scotland
Companies based in Edinburgh
Financial services companies established in 1887
British companies established in 1887
1887 establishments in Scotland